Oxford Tower can refer to:

Oxford Tower (Edmonton)
Oxford Tower (Toronto)
Oxford Tower (Warsaw)